The former Saint Joseph's Institution (Chinese: 前圣约瑟书院) is a historic building in Singapore, located at Bras Basah Road in the Museum Planning Area, within the Central Area. The building previously housed the Lasallian school Saint Joseph's Institution. However, it came into disuse after St. Joseph's Institution moved into a new campus on Malcolm Road in 1988. The building has since been restored and currently houses the Singapore Art Museum.

Architecture
Built on the site of a small Catholic chapel erected in the 1830s, the first in Singapore, the former Saint Joseph's Institution is another example of the work of a 19th-century French priest-architect, Brother Lothaire. Brother Lothaire was one of six Brothers, five Sisters and two young missionaries who came to Singapore with Reverend Father Jean Marie Beurel on his return from France in 1852 to found the new Catholic boys' school of Saint Joseph's Institution.

When the school was first completed in 1867, the completed building which is the current central block comprised a two-storey rectangular block with a pitched roof and modest belfry.

In 1903-1906, Father Nain, the then parish priest, added two new semi-circular wings to match the architectural theme of the central block and to define the fine Baroque entrance forecourt which is such an important part of the urban area in which it stands. This quality has been all but destroyed in recent years.

In 1910, verandahs running along the whole length of the building were added at the rear, a large dome built that replaced the old belfry was lined with teak and the cross was erected. New pediments and a parapet were also added. Brother Michael was responsible for the hall, gymnasium and the chapel, which were added between 1911 and 1912.

References
National Heritage Board (2002), Singapore's 100 Historic Places, Archipelago Press, 
Norman Edwards, Peter Keys (1996), Singapore - A Guide to Buildings, Streets, Places, Times Books International, 
Preservation of Monuments Board, Know Our Monuments

External links
Saint Joseph's Institution Online
Singapore Art Museum official website

Tourist attractions in Singapore
Landmarks in Singapore
National monuments of Singapore
School buildings completed in 1867
Museum Planning Area
19th-century architecture in Singapore